The Roxbox!: A Collection of Roxette's Greatest Songs is the second box set compilation by Swedish pop duo Roxette, released exclusively in Australia on 6 February 2015 by Roxette Recordings and Parlophone. The set was issued in conjunction with the final Australian leg of The Neverending World Tour, which took place the same month the compilation was released.

The Roxbox! is a shortened and updated version of the duo's 2006 box set The Rox Box/Roxette 86–06. Like its predecessor, the set contains the majority of the duo's greatest hits, as well as assorted b-sides, demos and album tracks, although The Roxbox! was updated to include several tracks from the duo's proceeding albums, Charm School (2011) and Travelling (2012), along with two non-album remixes created by Bassflow: "Speak to Me" and "The Sweet Hello, The Sad Goodbye". This set also omits the two DVDs contained on The Rox Box.

Commercial performance
The box set was a commercial success upon release in Australia. It debuted at number twenty before rising to number seventeen on its second week. In all, the album spent seven weeks on the Australian Albums Chart, peaking at number twelve.

Track listing
All songs written by Per Gessle and produced by Clarence Öfwerman, except where noted.

Notes
 signifies backing track co-production
 signifies remix and additional production

Charts

References

2015 compilation albums
Roxette compilation albums
Parlophone compilation albums